Yokote Gymnasium (横手体育館) is an indoor sporting arena located in Yokote, Akita, Japan.  It hosts indoor sporting events such as basketball,  volleyball and table tennis. It hosted National Sports Festival of Japan men's volleyball games in 2007. Japan women's national basketball team, Japan national 3x3 team, and Japan women's national 3x3 team practiced here.

Facilities
Main arena - 1,512m2 （42m×36m）
Medium arena - 448m2 （28m×16m）
Small arena - 192m2 （16m×12m）
Martial arts area - 156m2 （13m×12m）
Conference room
Shower rooms

References 

Sports venues in Akita Prefecture
Indoor arenas in Japan
Basketball venues in Japan
Yokote, Akita